Robert Grant Furlong (January 4, 1886 – March 19, 1973) was an American physician and politician who served one term as a Democratic member of the U.S. House of Representatives from Pennsylvania from 1943 to 1945.

Biography
Furlong was born in Roscoe, Pennsylvania.  He graduated from the State Teachers College in California, Pennsylvania, in 1904 and from Jefferson Medical College in Philadelphia, Pennsylvania, in 1909.

He taught school at Roscoe, PA, in 1904 and 1905, and practiced medicine in Donora, Pennsylvania, from 1910 to 1968.  During the First World War, Furlong served as a first lieutenant with the Two Hundred and Eightieth Ambulance Company, Twentieth Division.  He served as a burgess of Donora from 1922 to 1926 and again in 1941 and 1942.  He served as postmaster of Donora from 1933 to 1938.

Furlong was elected as a Democrat to the Seventy-eighth Congress, but was an unsuccessful candidate for renomination in 1944.  He resumed the practice of medicine, and was elected sheriff of Washington County, Pennsylvania, serving from 1945 to 1961.

References
 Retrieved on 2009-02-22
The Political Graveyard

1886 births
1973 deaths
American military personnel of World War I
Pennsylvania postmasters
California University of Pennsylvania alumni
Pennsylvania sheriffs
Democratic Party members of the United States House of Representatives from Pennsylvania
20th-century American politicians
Burials at Monongahela Cemetery